A waiting room is a place where people sit or stand until the event they are waiting for occurs.

Waiting Room(s) or The Waiting Room(s) may also refer to:

Film, TV and theatre
The Waiting Room (2007 film), a 2007 British film starring Anne-Marie Duff
The Waiting Room (2010 film), a 2010 Hindi film directed by Maneej Premnath
The Waiting Room (2012 film), a 2012 documentary film and social media project directed by Peter Nicks
The Waiting Room (2015 film), a 2015 Canadian film
The Waiting Room (2018 film), a 2018 Australian film directed by Molly Reynolds.
The Waiting Room (TV series), a 2008 Australian observational documentary 
The Waiting Room, a 2000 play by Tanika Gupta

Music
Waiting Room (band), an Australian rock band

Albums
The Waiting Room, a 2002 album by Poor Old Lu
The Waiting Room (Tindersticks album), 2016
The Waiting Room (John Mann album), 2014
Waiting Rooms (album), a 1997 album by Simon Warner
The Waiting Room, a 2005 album by Emanon
The Waiting Room (EP), a 1983 EP by Do-Ré-Mi

Songs
"Waiting Room" (song), a 1988 song by Fugazi
"Waiting Room", a song from No Doubt's 2001 album Rock Steady 
"The Waiting Room", a song from Genesis' 1974 album, The Lamb Lies Down on Broadway